The Palazzo Venturi, once known as Palazzo Doni is a Renaissance-style palace located in central Florence, region of Tuscany, Italy. It located on via de' Banchi 2. The palace differs from the Palazzo Venturi Ginori on Via della Scala.

History
The site was once the home of some houses belonging to the Bischeri family. In 1599, the Doni Family, who had acquired the site, commissioned the present structure from either Bernardo Buontalenti or Gherardo Silvani. The palace was inherited by the Bourbon del Monte, who sold it in 1667 to Cosimo Venturi, whose family also owned also the nearby palace on via de' Banchi 4. The Venturi family commissioned much of the interior decoration. The palace remained with the Venturi family until 1850, when it was sold to prince Ercole dei Pio of the Savoy Family. The palace is presently occupied by an inn.

The entrance to the palace still houses the heraldic shield of the Venturi, with three golden rocks on a blue background below the sign of the Anjou. The first floor has ceilings frescoed with grotteschi by Bernardino Poccetti.

Gallery

Bibliography
Translated from Italian Wikipedia entry
Marcello Vannucci, Splendidi palazzi di Firenze, Le Lettere, Firenze 1995.
Sandra Carlini, Lara Mercanti, Giovanni Straffi, I Palazzi parte seconda. Arte e storia degli edifici civili di Firenze, Alinea, Firenze 2004.

References

Buildings and structures completed in 1599
Houses completed in the 16th century
Venturi
Renaissance architecture in Florence
1599 establishments in Italy